This article shows all participating team squads at the 2011 FIVB Volleyball Men's Club World Championship, held from October 8 to 14, 2011 in Doha, Qatar.

Pool A

Jastrzębski Węgiel

Head Coach:  Lorenzo Bernardi

Trinity Western Spartans

Head Coach:  Ben Josephson

Zenit Kazan

Head Coach:  Vladimir Alenko

Paykan Tehran

Head Coach:  Peyman Akbari

Pool B

Trentino Diatec

Head Coach:  Radostin Stoytchev

Al-Ahly

Head Coach:  Ibrahim Fakhr Mohamed

SESI São Paulo

Head Coach:  Giovane Gávio

Al-Arabi

Head Coach:  Adel Sennoun

References

External links
Official website

C
C